Miss Wyoming is a state-level pageant which sends winners to compete for the title of Miss America. The competition, which awards scholarships, is open to women aged 17 through 24.

With Alaska became the latest state crowned the Miss America title, Wyoming is one of the few states along with Maine, South Dakota and West Virginia that has yet to win a Miss America, Miss USA, or Miss Teen USA title.

Hazel Homer-Wambeam of Laramie was crowned Miss Wyoming 2022 on June 25, 2022 at WYO Theatre in Sheridan, Wyoming. She competed for the title of Miss America 2023 at the Mohegan Sun in Uncasville, Connecticut in December 2022.

Results summary
The following is a visual summary of the past results of Miss Wyoming titleholders at the national Miss America pageants/competitions. The year in parentheses indicates the year of the national competition during which a placement and/or award was garnered, not the year attached to the contestant's state title.

Placements
 1st runners-up: Carol Held (1948)
 3rd runners-up: Lexie Madden (2013)
 Top 10: Elaine Lois Holkenbrink (1953)
 Top 15: Dorothy McKay (1947)

Awards

Preliminary awards
 Preliminary Lifestyle and Fitness: Elaine Lois Holkenbrink (1953)
 Preliminary Talent: N/A

Non-finalist awards
 Non-finalist Talent: Carol Rose (1969), Trish Long (1976), Carol June Wallace (1977), Kim Pring (1979)

Other awards
 Miss Congeniality: N/A
 Dr. David B. Allman Medical Scholarship: Cheryl Johnson (1975)
 Waterford Crystal Scholarship for Business Management and Marketing: Rebecca Darrington (1997)
 Women in Business Scholarship Award Finalists: Cheyenne Buyert (2018)

Winners

Notes

References

Wyoming
Wyoming culture
Women in Wyoming
1937 establishments in Wyoming
Recurring events established in 1937